Greenhills Adventure Park was a theme park located near Victor Harbor, South Australia. It was established in 1982, and officially opened in March 1983 by Gavin Keneally, South Australia Minister for Tourism.

It closed on 1 May 2016.

History

Origin 
Greenhills Adventure Park was founded by Margaret and Bill McKenzie, with Rosemary and Tom Builder, in 1982, and opened in 1983. It was a ten-hectare (about 25 acre) plot of land with over 20 attractions. To assist in maintain the park during its peak season, Meg Whibley was hired as Managing Director, along with three full time staff and 30 seasonal staff.

Closure 
In 2009, Margaret and Bill McKenzie sold the land to land developers Daniel McOmish and Dean Kyros, who wished to build 66 property allotments over the course of a four-stage development plan. The park continued to remain operational, as property, such as the overflow parking, was planned to be built on. In mid-2015, it was announced that the park would close on 1 May 2016 due to interest in the first stages of development as well as increases in electricity and water bills. The park sold discounted tickets to commemorate their last season. On 25 June 2016 the park hosted an auction selling much of its equipment.

Attractions

References

External links
Greenhills Adventure Park website.

Amusement parks in South Australia
1982 establishments in Australia
2016 disestablishments in Australia
Defunct amusement parks in Australia